Q97 may refer to:

Radio stations 
Canada
 CKEZ-FM, in New Glasgow, Nova Scotia

New Zealand
 Q97, operated by Radio Bay of Plenty in New Zealand

United States
 KKJQ, in Garden City, Kansas
 KQHN, in Waskom, Texas
 WKJQ-FM, in Parsons, Tennessee
 WUUQ, in South Pittsburg, Tennessee

Other uses 
 Al-Qadr (surah), of the Quran